The 2004 Heineken Open was a tennis tournament played on outdoor hard courts at the ASB Tennis Centre in Auckland in New Zealand and was part of the International Series of the 2004 ATP Tour. The tournament ran from 12 January through 18 January 2004. Unseeded Dominik Hrbatý won the singles title.

Finals

Singles

 Dominik Hrbatý defeated  Rafael Nadal 4–6, 6–2, 7–5
 It was Hrbatý's 2nd title of the year and the 7th of his career. It was also Nadal's 1st ATP Tour final.

Doubles

 Mahesh Bhupathi /  Fabrice Santoro defeated  Jiří Novák /  Radek Štěpánek 4–6, 7–5, 6–3
 It was Bhupathi's 1st title of the year and the 32nd of his career. It was Santoro's 1st title of the year and the 16th of his career.

References

External links
 
 ATP – tournament profile
 ITF – tournament edition details
 Singles draw
 Doubles draw

 
Heineken Open
Heineken Open
ATP Auckland Open
January 2004 sports events in New Zealand